Yana Shut (born 29 July 1997 in Minsk, Belarus) is a Belarusian snooker and pool player. She is the first IBSF Under-18 World Snooker Champion and also WLBSA World Snooker Mixed Doubles Champion. In 2018 she became European Champion in 10-Ball.

Career
Yana Shut started her career in 2005 at pool tournament in Belarus and won her first tournament in 2006, when she was only 9 years old. In 2012 Yana was representing her country at European Youth Pool Championship.

In 2013 Yana started to play snooker and in June 2013 she competed in the 2013 EBSA European Snooker Championships but lost in the quarter-final round to eventually winner Wendy Jans. The following year, Yana played in the WLBSA Ladies World Under-21 Championship where she would go on to face defending champion Hannah Jones in a thrilling final. Jones however was successful retaining the championship, defeating Yana Shut 3–1. In 2014 Yana Shut played and won WLBSA World Snooker Mixed Doubles Championship in team with professional player Ben Woollaston. In October 2015, Yana Shut entered the 2015 IBSF World Under-18 Snooker Championship as the number four seed, she advanced to the final where she defeated Anastasija Singurindi 3–0 to win the inaugural championship.

In 2017 Yana Shut competed in the 2017 EBSA European Snooker Championships but lost in semi-final round to Anna Prysazhnuka 4–2. In this year Yana played the 2017 EBSA European Team Snooker Championships where in team with Albina Liashchuk they lost in semi-final to team Belgium. In 2018 she reached the semi-final in the EBSA European Snooker Championships and lost to Cathy Dehaene.

Yana Shut has also competed in the men's EBSA European Under-21 Championships on several occasions playing against the likes of Jamie Clarke, Duane Jones, Rhys Clark and Kacper Filipiak.

In 2018 Yana Shut won the women's 10-Ball division of the European Pool Championships by beating Jasmin Ouschan 6–2 in final.

Tournament wins

Medals: : 13 (3 title)

References

External links
 
 
 

Belarusian snooker players
Living people
1997 births
Sportspeople from Minsk
Female snooker players
Belarusian pool players